"Quiet Times" is a pop song performed by Dido, released as the second download-only single from her third studio album, Safe Trip Home, and the third single overall. The single was released exclusively in Australia and many Eastern European territories. The song has featured on the TV series' Ghost Whisperer, One Tree Hill and Grey's Anatomy.

Track listing
 Digital download
 "Quiet Times" – 3:17

Charts

Release history

References

2009 singles
2008 songs
Dido (singer) songs
Songs written by Dido (singer)
Song recordings produced by Dido (singer)
Song recordings produced by the Ark
Sony BMG singles